Isaac Asimov's Robots and Aliens is a series of novels written by various authors and loosely connected to Isaac Asimov's Robot series.  Each volume is complete in itself, but they form a continuing series. The series  follows the action of the novels of the Isaac Asimov's Robot City series,  with the same protagonists Derec and Ariel, and many other characters.  The plot deals with the Three Laws and encounters between robots and different varieties of alien life.

 Changeling by Stephen Leigh (1989)
 Renegade by Cordell Scotten (1989)
 Intruder by Robert Thurston (1990)
 Alliance by Jerry Oltion (1990)
 Maverick by Bruce Bethke (1990)
 Humanity by Jerry Oltion (1990)

Timeline  
 The plot line continues, picking up several years after the Robot City/Robot and Aliens series, in "The Robot Mysteries" trilogy by Mark W. Tiedemann.
 The plot line continues on from Mark W. Tiedemann's trilogy in story "Have Robot, Will Travel" by Alexander C. Irvine.

References 

Science fiction book series